Ishikawajima do Brasil Estaleiros S.A commonly known as ISHIBRÁS was a shipbuilding company based in Rio de Janeiro, Brazil.

The company belonged to the Japanese multinational Ishikawajima-Harima Heavy Industries (IHI Corporation), and settled in Brazil in the late 1950s. The company was sold to the Emaq-Verolme consortium in 1994.

The Brazilian subsidiary, in addition to the ships it has built cranes for ships and cranes for quays and loading yards, and crawler excavators used in the mining area.

Projects and Products
NT Almirante Gastão Motta.
MV Karadeniz Powership Kaya Bey.
MV Karadeniz Powership Rauf Bey.

See also 
 List of ships of the Brazilian Navy 
 Brazilian Marine Corps
 Arsenal de Marinha do Rio de Janeiro

References

External links 
 Official site
Imigração japonesa e engenharia naval: O papel e a importância da Ishikawajima do Brasil (in Portuguese)

Buildings and structures in Rio de Janeiro (city)
Manufacturing companies based in Rio de Janeiro (city)
Defunct defence companies of Brazil
I
Engineering companies of Brazil
 
Manufacturing companies established in 1959
Military history of Brazil
Vehicle manufacturing companies established in 1959
Vehicle manufacturing companies disestablished in 1994
1959 establishments in Brazil
1994 disestablishments in Brazil